Senator Hottinger may refer to:

Jay Hottinger (born 1969), Ohio State Senate
John Hottinger (born 1945), Minnesota State Senate